Statistics of the Scottish Professional Football League in season 2013–14. It was the first season of the competition, which had been formed in the summer of 2013 by the merger of the Scottish Premier League and the Scottish Football League.

Scottish Premiership

Scottish Championship

Scottish League One

Scottish League Two

Award winners

See also
2013–14 in Scottish football

References

 
Scottish Professional Football League seasons